The broad-eared bat or broad-tailed bat (Nyctinomops laticaudatus) is a species of free-tailed bat from the Americas.

Description
The bats have a dark chocolate brown body with paler underparts, and hairless, translucent wings. The snout is pointed with an upturned tip, and the lower jaw is longer and narrower than is typical in free-tailed bats. As the common name of the bat suggests, the ears are unusually wide and rounded, and they join together in the middle of the forehead.

Distribution and habitat
Broad-eared bats are found in tropical and subtropical forests from coastal Mexico to southern Brazil. It has been reported from a range of forest types, as well as scrubland and cerrado habitats, and even in urban areas. Five subspecies are recognised:

 N. l. laticaudatus - southern Paraguay and neighbouring parts of Brazil and Argentina
 N. l. europs - South America east of the Andes, from Venezuela to northern Paraguay and Argentina
 N. l. ferrugineus - coastal regions of central and northeastern Mexico
 N. l. macarenensis - South America west of the Andes, from westernmost Venezuela to northernmost Peru
 N. l. yucatanicus - Central America, southern Mexico, and Cuba

Biology and behaviour
Broad-eared bats are nocturnal, and roost during the day in rocky crevices in tightly packed groups of anything from 150 to 1,000 individuals. However, in Tamaulipas, colonies of several thousand have been reported roosting in caves. Such colonies can be resident throughout the year, but are not always so, and individual bats do not always return to the same home area.

The bats are insectivorous, feeding mainly on beetles and moths. Predators include owls, sparrowhawks, and tree-climbing snakes.

Broad-nosed bats breed in the rainy season, giving birth between June and July in the northern parts of their range, and later in the year further south.

References

External links

Nyctinomops
Mammals described in 1805
Bats of Central America
Bats of South America
Mammals of Colombia